Graphium kigoma is a butterfly in the family Papilionidae (swallowtails). It is found in Tanzania, from the western part of the country to the Kigoma District. The habitat consists of forests (including riparian forests) and heavy woodland.

Taxonomy
Graphium kigoma belongs to a species group with 16 members. All are very similar
The species group members are:
Graphium abri Smith & Vane-Wright, 2001 
Graphium adamastor  (Boisduval, 1836) 
Graphium agamedes (Westwood, 1842)
Graphium almansor (Honrath, 1884)
Graphium auriger (Butler, 1876) 
Graphium aurivilliusi (Seeldrayers, 1896)
Graphium fulleri  (Grose-Smith, 1883)
Graphium hachei (Dewitz, 1881)
Graphium kigoma Carcasson, 1964
Graphium olbrechtsi Berger, 1950
Graphium poggianus (Honrath, 1884)
Graphium rileyi Berger, 1950
Graphium schubotzi (Schultze, 1913)
Graphium simoni (Aurivillius, 1899),
Graphium ucalegon  (Hewitson, 1865)[
Graphium ucalegonides (Staudinger, 1884)

References

kigoma
Butterflies of Africa
Endemic fauna of Tanzania
Lepidoptera of Tanzania
Butterflies described in 1964